Baron Erik Teodor Marks von Würtemberg (1861, Björnlunda – 1937) was a Swedish jurist and politician. He served as Foreign Minister of Sweden 1923–1924 in the government of Ernst Trygger, representing the General Electoral Union. During his tenure, Sweden recognised the Soviet Union.

He was a member of the Swedish Supreme Court (Högsta domstolen) 1903–1920 and chief judge of the Svea Court of Appeal (Svea hovrätt) 1920–1931. He also represented Sweden at the Paris Peace Conference in 1919 and in the League of Nations from 1920 to 1929. He was subsequently a member of the Permanent Court of Arbitration in The Hague.

Honours

Swedish honours 

 Knight of the Royal Order of the Seraphim, 6 June 1926.
Commander Grand Cross of the Royal Order of the Polar Star, 6 June 1913.
 Commander 1st Class of the Royal Order of the Polar Star, 15 May 1905.
 Commander of the Royal Order of the Polar Star, 30 November 1901.
 Knight of the Royal Order of the Polar Star, 1 December 1898.

Foreign honours 

 Grand Cross of the Order of the Dannebrog. 26 January 1921.
 Grand Cross of the Order of the White Rose of Finland, 1925.
 Grand Officer of the Legion of Honour, 1922.
 Grand Cross of the Order of St. Olav, 13 October 1919.
 Commander 1st Class of the Order of St. Olav, 22 October 1904.

References 

This article is a translation of the corresponding article on the Swedish Wikipedia, accessed 8 February 2007.

1861 births
1937 deaths
People from Gnesta Municipality
Swedish nobility
Swedish people of German descent
Swedish Ministers for Foreign Affairs
Justices of the Supreme Court of Sweden
20th-century Swedish judges
20th-century Swedish politicians
Barons of Sweden
Swedish diplomats
Knights of the Order of the Polar Star
Grand Crosses of the Order of the Dannebrog
Order of the White Rose of Finland
Grand Officiers of the Légion d'honneur
Order of Saint Olav